Robert J. Kolenkow is an American physicist and teacher.  He is best known for being the coauthor, along with Daniel Kleppner, of a popular undergraduate physics textbook.

Kolenkow did his undergraduate work at the Massachusetts Institute of Technology, graduating in 1955.  For a time, he was an associate professor of physics at MIT.  His departure in 1971 generated some controversy on campus; he was regarded as an excellent teacher by his students, however, the administration was viewed as being more concerned about research than education when making its tenure decisions.

Kolenkow became a professor at Carleton College in Northfield, Minnesota.  He also co-authored a textbook on physical geography which was favorably reviewed.

Books

External links
  Column concerning Kolenkow's denial of tenure.

Year of birth missing (living people)
Living people
Massachusetts Institute of Technology alumni
Massachusetts Institute of Technology School of Science  faculty
21st-century American physicists
American textbook writers